The Riley-Ford Special is a unique lightweight roadster and dirt-track racing sprint car built between 1933 and 1938. It was built using readily available components at the time. The chassis is an Essex frame, and uses a Franklin steering column and system. It used a Ford front axle with a Halibrand quick-change rear end. It is powered by a George Riley-designed OHV Ford flathead V8 engine.

References

1930s cars
Roadsters